The Order of British Columbia is a civilian honour for merit in the Canadian province of British Columbia. Instituted in 1989 by Lieutenant Governor David Lam, on the advice of the Cabinet under Premier Bill Vander Zalm, the order is administered by the Governor-in-Council and is intended to honour current or former British Columbia residents for conspicuous achievements in any field, being thus described as the highest honour amongst all others conferred by the British Columbia Crown.

Structure and appointment
The Order of British Columbia, which evolved out of and replaced the earlier Order of the Dogwood, is intended to honour any current or former longtime resident of British Columbia who has demonstrated a high level of individual excellence and achievement in any field, demonstrating the "greatest distinction and excell[ence] in any field of endeavour benefiting the people of the Province or elsewhere." Only those who are elected or appointed members of a governmental body are ineligible as long as they hold office. There are no limits on how many can belong to the order or be inducted at one time.

The process of finding qualified individuals begins with submissions from the public to the Order of British Columbia's advisory council, which consists of the Chief Justice of British Columbia, who serves as the Chair; the Speaker of the Legislative Assembly; a president, in turn, of one of British Columbia's public universities, for a two-year term; the President of the Union of British Columbia Municipalities; the Deputy Minister of Intergovernmental Relations; and two Members of the order. This committee then meets once yearly to make its selected recommendations to the lieutenant governor. Posthumous nominations are not accepted, though an individual who dies after his or her name was submitted to the advisory council can still be retroactively made a Member of the Order of British Columbia. The lieutenant governor, ex officio a Member and the Chancellor of the Order of British Columbia, then makes all appointments into the fellowship's single grade of membership by an Order in Council that bears the viceroyal sign-manual and the Great Seal of the province; thereafter, the new Members are entitled to use the post-nominal letters OBC.

Insignia

Upon admission into the Order of British Columbia, in a ceremony held at Government House in Victoria, new Members are presented with the order's insignia. The main badge consists of a gold medallion in the form of a stylized flower of the Pacific Dogwood—the official provincial flower—with the obverse in white enamel with gold edging, and bearing at its centre the escutcheon of the arms of British Columbia, all surmounted by a St. Edward's Crown symbolizing the Canadian monarch's role as the fount of honour. The ribbon is patterned with vertical stripes in green, white, blue, and gold, reflecting the colours within the provincial coat of arms; men wear the medallion suspended from this ribbon at the collar, while women carry theirs on a ribbon bow at the left chest. Members will also receive for wear on casual clothing a rosette, appearing as a smaller enamel Dogwood flower capped by a crown.

Inductees
Past appointments include:

 Bryan Guy Adams , Grammy Award winning musician and photographer, appointed 1990
 Shushma Datt, Radio and television broadcaster, appointed 1992
 Unity Bainbridge, artist and poet, appointed 1993
 Michael Conway Baker , composer, appointed 1997
 Dr. Geoffrey Ballard , geophysicist and businessman, appointed 2003
 Dave Barrett , BC's first NDP Premier, appointed 2012
 Brigadier Henry Pybus Bell-Irving , Lieutenant Governor of British Columbia, appointed 1990
Leon Bibb, musician and actor, appointed 2009
 Peter M. Brown , financier, appointed 2003
 Frank Arthur Calder , first aboriginal Canadian elected to any Canadian legislature, appointed 2004
 Gordon Campbell , three-term Premier of British Columbia, appointed 2011
 Raffi Cavoukian , children's entertainer, appointed 2001
 Frankie Edroff , philanthropist, appointed 2010 
 Lance Finch , former Chief Justice of British Columbia, appointed 2017
 Lori Fung Methorst , Olympic gymnast, appointed 1990
 Garde Basil Gardom , Lieutenant Governor of British Columbia, appointed 2002
 Paul George , Environmentalist, appointed 2020
 Gordon Gibson , politician, columnist, and author, appointed 2008
 Nancy Catherine Greene , Senator and Olympic alpine skier, appointed 2004
 Richard M. Hansen , paraplegic athlete and activist, appointed 1990
 Walter Hardwick , teacher and deputy minister of education, appointed 1997
 Tara Singh Hayer , Indo Canadian Newspaper publisher, appointed 1995 
 Bob Hindmarch  Professor and ice hockey coach, appointed 2010
 Edward John Hughes , artist, appointed 2005
 Dr Robert Joseph, OBC, Hereditary Chief of the Gwawaenuk First Nation, and Ambassador for Reconciliation Canada, appointed 2015
 Douglas Jung , first Chinese Canadian federal Member of Parliament, appointed 1997
 Edgar Kaiser Jr.
 Mary Kitagawa , educator, appointed 2018
 Joy Kogawa , author and poet, appointed 2006
 Diana Jean Krall , jazz musician, appointed 2000
 David Foster OC OBC, Grammy Award winning musician and record executive, appointed 1995
 David Lam, Lieutenant-Governor of BC, appointed 1995
 Peter Anthony Larkin , fisheries scientist, appointed 1996
 Robert H. Lee , real estate executive and philanthropist, appointed 1990
 Robert Italo Lenarduzzi , coach of Canadian Olympic and national soccer teams, appointed 2005
 Trevor Linden , professional hockey player, appointed 2003
 Clarence Louie , Chief of the Osoyoos Indian Band, appointed 2004
 Sarah Ann McLachlan , musician, singer, and songwriter, appointed 2001
 Kenneth McVay , internet activist, appointed 1995
 James Mavor Moore , writer, producer, critic, and educator, appointed 1999
 Stephen John Nash , National Basketball Association player, appointed 2006
 Wally Oppal , former Attorney General of British Columbia and Justice of British Columbia Court of Appeal, appointed 2017
 Sophie Pierre , Chief of St. Mary's Indian Band and commissioner for the BC Treaty Commission, appointed 1994
 Derek Porter-Nesbitt , Olympic rower, appointed 1996
 Christopher Duncan Rose , teacher, school principal and school trustee, founder of the Chris Rose Therapy Centre for Autism, appointed 2010
 Martin Schechter , HIV/AIDS scientist, appointed 1994
 Ernest Alvia Smith , last living Canadian recipient of the Victoria Cross, appointed 2002
 Michael Smith , UBC scientist and BC's first Nobel Prize winner, appointed 1994
 David Takayoshi Suzuki , environmentalist and science broadcaster, appointed 1995
 Susan Tatoosh, Indigenous leader, appointed 2019
 Arthur Vickers (artist) , artist, storyteller and philanthropist, appointed 2008
 Peter Wing , first mayor of Chinese descent in North America, appointed 1990
 Tamara Taggart, former Canadian news anchor, appointed 2015
 Tamara Vrooman,  businesswoman

Rescinded
 David Sidoo, CFL player, philanthropist, criminal, appointed 2016, rescinded in 2020

See also
 Canadian order of precedence (decorations and medals)
 Symbols of British Columbia
 State decoration

External links
The Order of British Columbia Webpage

References

British Columbia awards
Provincial and territorial orders of Canada